Bjørlo is a surname. Notable people with the surname include:

Alfred Bjørlo (born 1972), Norwegian politician
Kjetil Bjørlo (born 1968), Norwegian orienteering competitor
Per Inge Bjørlo (born 1952), Norwegian sculptor, painter, graphic designer, and visual artist

Norwegian-language surnames